Vasagatan is a major street in central Stockholm named after King Gustav Vasa.

In its southern end it is connected to the old town Gamla Stan by the bridge Vasabron, from where it stretches north to the public square Norra Bantorget.  It passes in front of the Stockholm Central Station and is intercepted by Kungsgatan.

Buildings at Vasagatan 
Central Post Office Building
Stockholm Central Station

See also 
 Geography of Stockholm

Streets in Stockholm